"" is a song recorded by Italian singer-songwriter Marco Mengoni, with featured vocals by Madame. The song was released to Italian radio stations on 31 December 2021 as the third single from Mengoni's sixth studio album.

Background
Written by Mengoni and Madame with Alex Andrea Vella, Riccardo Scirè and Tony Maiello, the song was produced by Purple Disco Machine. It is a song about trust, described as the key element in every relationship, not only related to rationality, but also tied to primordial elements such as instinct and chemistry.

Music video
The music video for the song was released on 14 January 2022. Directed by Riccardo Ortu, the video features actor Vincenzo Crea and was shot in  the suburbs of Rome.

Live performances
Marco Mengoni performed the song, without Madame's contribution, during the final of the Sanremo Music Festival 2022, appearing as a guest artist.

Charts

Certifications

References

2021 singles
2021 songs
Marco Mengoni songs
Madame (singer) songs
Songs written by Marco Mengoni
Sony Music singles